Aleksander Kazimierz Sapieha (13 May 1624 – 22 May 1671) was a Polish nobleman. He became bishop of Samogitia in 1660 and of Vilnius in 1667.

After the abdication of Jan Kazimierz, he initially supported the candidacy of Philip William, Elector Palatine, the son-in-law of Sigismund III Vasa, but later supported the successful election of Michał Korybut Wiśniowiecki.

Bibliography 
 Urzędnicy centralni i dygnitarze Wielkiego Księstwa Litewskiego XIV-XVIII wieku. Spisy. Ed. Henryk Lulewicz and Andrzej Rachuba. Kórnik 1994, p. 237.

References

External links 
 Biskup Aleksander Kazimierz Sapieha

1624 births
1671 deaths
Aleksander Kazimierz
Bishops of Vilnius
Canons of Warsaw
Ecclesiastical senators of the Polish–Lithuanian Commonwealth
People from Volyn Oblast
17th-century Roman Catholic bishops in the Polish–Lithuanian Commonwealth